Marylin Maeso (born January 13, 1988) is a French philosopher and teacher, known as a specialist on Albert Camus.

She is an antiracist.

Education 
Maeso was born in Montpellier. A graduate of the École normale supérieure where she completed an agrégation in philosophy.

Camus 
Marylin Maeso first discovered Camus (Le Mythe de Sisyphe) while studying for her Baccalauréat in London.

Teaching & medias 
Whilst working as a high school philosophy teacher, Maeso has authored a number of books as well as making media appearances and contributions to Le Point and Le Monde. She is a university philosophy lecturer in Orléans. Her book Les conspirateurs du silence is based on Camus' essay Le témoin de la liberté (The Witness of Freedom), published in December 1948 in La Gauche.

Bibliography

Les conspirateurs du silence,  Éditions de l'observatoire, 2018, 
L'Abécédaire d'Albert Camus, Éditions de l'observatoire, 2020, 
Les lents demains qui chantent, Éditions de l'observatoire, 2020, 
La petite fabrique de l'inhumain, Éditions de l'observatoire, 2021,

References

Living people
French women philosophers
École Normale Supérieure alumni
French writers
1988 births